The Rev. John Owen Farquhar Murray (6 May 1858 – 29 November 1944) was an Anglican clergyman, and Master of Selwyn College, Cambridge from 1909 to 1928.

Biography
Murray was a son of Surgeon-General John Murray. He married at St. Michael′s church, Cambridge, on 9 December 1902 to Frances Margaret Somerset, daughter of Rev. R. B. Somerset.

He was in 1902 Examining chaplain to the Bishop of Ely (Lord Alwyne Compton), and a dean of Emmanuel College, Cambridge.

References

 ‘MURRAY, Rev. John Owen Farquhar’, Who Was Who, A & C Black, an imprint of Bloomsbury Publishing plc, 1920–2008; online edn, Oxford University Press, Dec 2012 ; online edn, Oct 2012 accessed 7 March 2013
 

1858 births
1944 deaths
19th-century Church of England clergy
20th-century Church of England clergy
Masters of Selwyn College, Cambridge
Fellows of Emmanuel College, Cambridge